The Smooth Career is a 1967 West German drama film directed by Haro Senft and starring Bruno Ganz, Verena Buss and Wolfgang Büttner.

Cast
 Bruno Ganz as Bernhard Kral
  as Johanna Benedikt
 Wolfgang Büttner as Richard Benedikt
 Lia Eibenschütz as Gertrud Benedikt
 Hans Putz as Wolf Kamper
 Dany Mann as Susanne Kamper
 Jan Kačer as Stefan
 Nina Divíšková as Věra
 Vladimír Hlavatý as Prof. König
 Peter Höfer as Alfred Reichert
 Rolf Ederer as Direktor Burckhardt
 Ralf Gregan as Joe Vielhaber
 Lutz Hochstraate as Klaus

References

Bibliography
 Peter Cowie & Derek Elley. World Filmography: 1967. Fairleigh Dickinson University Press, 1977.

External links

1967 films
West German films
1967 drama films
German drama films
1960s German-language films
1960s German films